Lo La Ru (stylised in all caps) is the third studio album by Australian alternative rock group, The Rubens. The album was released on 29 June 2018.

Ruben Elliott Margin told Triple J Lo La Ru is the name of the world that The Rubens built to make this album. "We came up with this idea of creating a fake nation behind this album. Because we'd created our own little world; brought these producers over from New York, had a studio in our hometown, [do] whatever we'd like to do and have fun doing it." They even gave the fictional nation a flag, which became the album's artwork.

In August 2018, the group announced a 12-date national "Lo La Ru" tour, which expanded to a 16-date tour in September. The tour commenced in Brunswick Heads, New South Wales on 2 November.

Reception
Madelyn Tait from The Music gave the album 3½ out of 5 saying "Lo La Ru is full of fun, soul-injected rock tracks." She added: "The Rubens expand on and bring the hip hop and R&B elements they touched on in previous releases to the forefront."

Josh Leeson from The Herald gave the album 2½ out of 5 and thought The Rubens "attempted to replicate the appeal of "Hoops" by turning up their R&B and pop influences" but added "at times the album does wallow in lounge music mediocrity." Lesson said the album highlight is "God Forgot".

Tim Byron from The Sydney Morning Herald gave the album 3 out of 5, saying "Lo La Rus soul-inflected indie rock is pleasantly melodic, often with a good sense of groove, and tastefully recorded. It also feels a little timid, however, as though this is a band trying to please everyone, rather than a band making a stand with fire and authority. All of which means that in six months we'll probably be hearing these songs on ads for cars and health insurance."

Track listing

Note: "All My Dollars" contains hidden track "Young Me", beginning at 4:14

PersonnelThe RubensSam Margin – lead vocals (all tracks), guitar
Elliott Margin – keyboards, backing vocals (all tracks), lead vocals (track 1)
Izaac Margin – lead guitar
William Zeglis – bass guitar, engineering
Scott Baldwin – drumsAdditional musicians'
Sarah Aarons – guest vocals (track 4)

Charts

Release history

References

2018 albums
The Rubens albums
Ivy League Records albums